John Ball (born November 5, 1972 in Newtown, Connecticut) is an American soccer player who most recently played for the PASL team Cleveland Freeze.  He has an extensive career, playing both indoor and outdoor soccer.  He spent one season in Major League Soccer with the Chicago Fire and was a part of the United States national futsal team which went to the second round of the 2004 FIFA Futsal World Championship.

Player

College
Ball played college soccer for Southern Connecticut State.  While at Southern Connecticut State, his team won the NCAA Division II Championship in his freshman and senior year while reaching the Final Four in all four years.

Professional
On January 1, 1996, the Cleveland Crunch selected Ball in the second round of the 1995 National Professional Soccer League Amateur Draft.  He played game at the end of the regular season.  However, he played several during the playoffs as the Crunch won the league championship.  He remained with the Crunch for the 1996-1997 season.  He was named to the All Rookie team that year, despite playing one game during the previous season, as the Crunch fell to the Kansas City Attack in the championship series.  

In addition to his indoor career, Ball had an extensive outdoor career as well.  In the summer of 1996, he signed with the Connecticut Wolves of the USISL.  In 1997, he moved to the Carolina Dynamo and then the Staten Island Vipers in 1998.  He was All League that season.  In 1998, Ball returned to the Crunch and played for them every winter until the team folded in 2005.  On July 15, 1999, the Chicago Fire signed Ball as a discovery player.  He made his debut against the Dallas Burn, playing 90 minutes, on August 22, 1999.  He scored his first and only MLS goal in the Western Conference Semifinals against the Dallas Burn on October 16, 1999.  The Fire released him at the end of the season.  In 2000, Ball moved to the Rochester Rhinos for one season before signing with the Charleston Battery in 2001.  He continued his nomadic ways, playing for the Carolina Dynamo in 2002, the Milwaukee Wave United in 2003 and the Atlanta Silverbacks in 2004.  

In 2005, Ball rejoined the Rochester Raging Rhinos of the USL-1. While he had spent most of his outdoor career in the midfield, he moved to right back in 2008.  In 2010, the Rhinos did not re-sign Ball and he moved to the amateur CASL Elite.  During these years, Ball continued to play indoor soccer.  In 2005, the Chicago Storm selected Ball in the MISL Dispersal Draft after Cleveland folded.  However, in a December 3, 2005 game against the Baltimore Blast, Ball had an altercation with a fan which led to a two game suspension by the league.  This led the Storm to trade Ball to the California Cougars for Anthony Maher and the rights to Andy Rosenband on December 27, 2005.  In January 2007, the Cougars traded Ball back to the Storm in exchange for Semir Mesanovic, Elvir Kafedzic and a first round draft pick in the 2007 MISL Amateur Draft.  

On January 27, 2010, Ball joined the Ohio Vortex of the Professional Arena Soccer League.  Ball played the amateur team CASL Elite in the Lamar Hunt U.S. Open Cup in 2010; his team won their regional qualification group (which also featured NPSL teams FC Tulsa and Atlanta FC) before falling 4-2 to USL Second Division pro side Charleston Battery in the first round of tournament proper.  On January 27, 2010, Ball signed with the Ohio Vortex of the Professional Arena Soccer League, playing three games and scoring one goal through the end of the season.  In February 2012, he joined the Rochester Lancers.

Coach
Ball is a coach in the Cleveland, Ohio area. He was the boys' high school coach at Elyria from 2012 to 2014 and is currently a club coach with Cleveland Futbol Club.

References

External links
 Rochester Rhinos bio
 
 

1972 births
Living people
American soccer players
American men's futsal players
Association football midfielders
Atlanta Silverbacks players
California Cougars players
North Carolina Fusion U23 players
Charleston Battery players
Chicago Fire FC players
Chicago Storm (MISL) players
Cleveland Crunch players
Cleveland Force (2002–2005 MISL) players
Connecticut Wolves players
Futsal players at the 2007 Pan American Games
Major Indoor Soccer League (2001–2008) players
Major Indoor Soccer League (2008–2014) players
Major League Soccer players
Milwaukee Wave United players
National Professional Soccer League (1984–2001) players
Pan American Games competitors for the United States
People from Newtown, Connecticut
Professional Arena Soccer League players
Rochester New York FC players
Soccer players from Connecticut
Southern Connecticut Fighting Owls men's soccer players
Staten Island Vipers players
A-League (1995–2004) players
USL First Division players
USISL Select League players
High school soccer coaches in the United States